MemeM (stylized as memeM) is the third EP by South Korean girl group Purple Kiss. It was released on March 29, 2022 by RBW. The album includes 7 tracks with "memeM" released as the title track. The 4th b-side track of the album titled "Pretty Psycho" was also used to promote the release. The physical album comes in two versions as Meme and M.

Background and release 
On March 08, 2022, RBW announced Purple Kiss would be releasing a new album in post March 2022, and through a logo motion video the title was revealed to be memeM. On March 20, the music video teaser for lead single "memeM" was released. 4 days later, the highlight medley video teaser, together with the track listing, was released. The album was released on March 29.

Composition 
The title song "memeM",which shares the same name as the album, was written by Kim Do-hoon, Seo Yong-bae, Lee Hu-sang and Kang Ji-won. It was composed in the key of B major, with a tempo of 150 beats per minute. Other tracks include "Intro: Illusion", "Oh My Gosh", a pop R&B track, "Pretty Psycho" which is sampled from "Intro: Freaky Purky" from their second EP Hide & Seek, "Joah", a R&B track, "Hate me, Hurt me, Love me", and "Cursor", a down tempo track.

Promotion 
After 6 days of release, on April 04, 2022, they held a live media showcase in Ilji Art Hall, Gangnam-gu, Seoul to introduce the EP. It was scheduled to be held on the same day, but as 3 members tested positive for COVID-19, all promotional activities were postponed for one week.

Commercial performance 
The EP debuted at number 7 on South Korean's Gaon Album Chart in the chart issue dated March 27– April 02, 2022; on the monthly chart, the EP debuted at number 24 in the chart issue dated March 2022 with 36,140 copies sold. On South Korean Hanteo Charts it was recorded that the album sales on the first day are tripled with this release, selling more than 23,000 copies on first day.

Critical reception
In addition, Pretty Psycho has been listed as one of the '25 Best K-Pop B-Sides of 2022' by Genius. Genius stated "The falsettos and the infectious bassline make it a solid b-side worthy of being a title track."

Year-end lists

Track listing

Personnel

Studios 
 RBW Studios – recording, digital editing, audio mixing
 821Sound Mastering – mastering

Personnel 

 Purple Kiss (Park Ji-eun, Na Go-eun, Dosie, Ireh, Yuki, Chaein, Swan) – vocals
 Kim Do-hoon – production, direction
 Davve – production, direction, recording
 Kang Ji-won – production, direction, bass, piano, synthesizer, drum programming, recording, mixing
 Kanghyun – guitar
 Kim Tae-su – guitar
 Lee Hoo-sang – bass, piano, drum programming
 Lee Beam-su– bass
 Kim Min-ki – piano, keyboard, synthesizer, drum programming, recording
 Kim Ji-eun – piano, electronic piano
 Cosmic Sound – keyboard, chorus
 Yoon Young-joon – keyboard
 Lee Lee Sang – synthesizer
 Perrie – chorus
 Seo Yong-bae – recording
 Jo Eun-ju – recording
 Kang Roy – recording
 Yoo Sang-ho – mixing
 Uncle Jo – mixing
 Shin – mixing
 Master Key – mixing
 Kwon Nam-woo – mastering

Charts

Weekly charts

Monthly charts

Sales

Release history

References 

2022 EPs
Korean-language EPs